John Kearns (4 January 1914 – 14 February 1945) was an English professional footballer who played as a full back in the Football League for Tranmere Rovers.

Personal life
Kearns was married and served as a bombardier in the Royal Artillery during the Second World War. He died on active service on 14 February 1945 and is buried at South Shoebury (St. Andrew) Churchyard, Essex.He left a widow, Betty.

Career statistics

References

1914 births
1945 deaths
People from the Borough of Newcastle-under-Lyme
Footballers from Staffordshire
Association football fullbacks
English footballers
English Football League players
Millwall F.C. players
Wolverhampton Wanderers F.C. players
Tranmere Rovers F.C. players
British Army personnel killed in World War II
Royal Artillery soldiers
Military personnel from Staffordshire